Zoltán Venczel (born 9 July 1994) is a Hungarian professional footballer who plays for Lombard-Pápa TFC.

Club statistics

Updated to games played as of 18 May 2014.

References

MLSZ 
HLSZ 

1994 births
Living people
People from Pápa
Hungarian footballers
Association football midfielders
Lombard-Pápa TFC footballers
Nemzeti Bajnokság I players
Sportspeople from Veszprém County